Tota is a town and municipality in the department of Boyacá, Colombia, part of the Sugamuxi Province. Tota is located approximately 40 km from Sogamoso and the municipality borders in the north Cuítiva, Aquitania in the east, Zetaquirá and San Eduardo in the south and westward of Tota the municipality of Pesca is located. Nearby and named after the village is Lake Tota, the largest lake of Colombia.

History 
Before the Spanish conquest of the central highlands of Colombia (Altiplano Cundiboyacense), the area around Tota was inhabited by the Muisca, ruled by the zaque of Hunza, currently known as Tunja. In the Chibcha language of the Muisca, Tota means "tillage of the river".

The first European to enter the territories of the northern Muisca Confederation was Gonzalo Jiménez de Quesada.

Economy 
The economical activities of Tota are mainly agriculture (potatoes, carrots, peas, onions and others), livestock farming, mining and tourism (Lake Tota).

Gallery

See also 
 Lake Tota

References 

Municipalities of Boyacá Department
Muisca Confederation
Muysccubun